A bathroom cabinet is a cabinet in a bathroom, most often used to store hygiene products, toiletries, and sometimes also medications such that it works as an improvised medicine cabinet. Bathroom cabinets are usually placed under sinks, over sinks, or above toilets. Many mirror cabinets are combined with a lamp that illuminates the mirror and thereby (especially in small bathrooms) also the room. Bathroom cabinets often either have an integrated electrical socket or are placed close to one so that appliances such as an electric shaver or hairdryer can be used. Bathroom cabinets have become much more technologically advanced with retailers today offering features like Bluetooth audio, mood lighting, and anti-fog technology.

See also
 List of furniture types
 Toiletry kit
 Shelf (storage)

References 

Cabinets (furniture)
Furniture
Bathrooms
Medicine storage containers